is a 2019 anime television series in the Cardfight!! Vanguard franchise that continues the reboot storyline of the Prime series, roughly based on the Cardfight!! Vanguard manga by Akira Ito. The anime-exclusive episodes were first broadcast on TV Tokyo at 8.00am JST Saturday and made available on the website AbemaTV at 9.00pm JST on the same night. The episodes are also uploaded with English subtitles through the official YouTube channel and Crunchyroll.

Plot
The main protagonist Aichi Sendou, was a timid and mundane third-year middle school boy. The thing that supported Aichi's heart, was the "Blaster Blade" card that he received as a child. It's an important rare card from "Vanguard", a card game with the imaginary world of "Planet Cray" as its stage. From the day he reunited with the person who gave him that card "Toshiki Kai", Aichi's everyday life began to change.

Aichi and his friends protected Planet Cray from the threat of an invasion by Wandering Star Brandt. However, with destiny being corrected, memories of Kourin Tatsunagi and the battle against Brandt have disappeared.

With the "Vanguard Koshien" fast approaching, the battle to regain the missing "something" begins for the vanguards.

Theme music
The BanG Dream! band Raise A Suilen performs the season's opening "INVINCIBLE FIGHTER" and ending "Takin' my Heart".

Episode list

References

Cardfight!! Vanguard
2019 Japanese television seasons